Alexanderson Day, named after the Swedish radio engineer Ernst Fredrik Werner Alexanderson and held either on the last Sunday in June, or on the first Sunday in July, whichever comes closer to 2 July, is the day of the open house at the Swedish government VLF transmitter Grimeton, call sign SAQ, located near Varberg. On Alexanderson Day, Christmas Eve, and at other times during the year, the only workable Alexanderson alternator transmitter in the world is used to transmit short Morse messages on 17.2 kHz, which should be easily receivable in all of Europe.  The transmitter is preserved as a historical remnant of early radio technology and as an example of VLF (Very Low Frequency) equipment.

These transmissions cannot be received by ordinary radios because of their low frequency. Modern enthusiasts often monitor the transmissions using a PC with a coil connected to the soundcard input and FFT analysis software, or a short-wave receiver with an upconverter, or any of several receivers designed to receive VLF transmissions directly. In recent years, Software-defined radio receivers have proven to be very useful and effective in receiving transmissions from SAQ around the world.

References

External links
Alexander Friendship Association Home Page
Alexanderson Day Youtube video of equipment in operation

History of radio
June observances
July observances
Year of establishment missing